Rukmavati Ki Haveli (1991) is an Indian feature film.

The film is directed by Govind Nihalani and is based on Federico Garcia Lorca's Spanish play The House of Bernarda Alba. The screenplay is written by Nihalani himself.

Plot
Nihalani's screenplay transports Lorca's Spanish setting on to a Rajasthan village. Rukmavati, a domineering matriarch has five daughters Savitri, Damayanti, Chandra, Mumal and Padma, all unmarried. The domineering woman has inexorable control over her daughters placing them all in a repressive setting where they don't have any social life of their own outside their home. The frustrated and angry daughters respond in their individual ways to their mother's cruelty leading to a tragic ending.

Nahar Singh starts courting the eldest daughter Savitri but the youngest daughter Padma falls in love with him. He also responds to her. This makes Mumal jealous of her. One night as Padma goes out with Nahar, Mumal follows them leading to a confrontation. Rukmavati fires at Nahar. Padma commits suicide. Rukmavati, shaken but unbending still, has only to say, "My daughter died a virgin."

Awards
Ajay Munjal and A.M. Padmanabhan won the 39th National Film Award for best audiography and Samir Chanda for best art direction for the film.

Cast
Uttara Baokar as Rukmavati.
Ila Arun as Savitri.
Kitu Gidwani as Mumal.
Pallavi Joshi as Padma.
Jyoti Subhash as Dhapabai.
Sohaila Kapur as Damayanti.
Suneeta Sengupta as Chandra.
Shikha Diwan as Bhanwari.

References

External links
 

1991 films
Indian films based on plays
1990s Hindi-language films
Films directed by Govind Nihalani
Films whose production designer won the Best Production Design National Film Award
Films that won the Best Audiography National Film Award